"Hate On Me" was a single released in 2007 by American  R&B/soul singer/actress Jill Scott. The song was released in support of her third studio album, The Real Thing: Words and Sounds Vol. 3. Hate On Me peaked at number 24 on Billboard's Hot R&B/Hip-Hop Songs chart, Scott's re-entry R&B top 40 song since 2005. The song also earned Scott a Grammy nomination in 2008, for Best Female R&B Vocal Performance. The song was recorded by the cast of American television series, Glee, and was performed in first season episode, Throwdown. The song is also featured on the soundtrack album, Glee: The Music, Volume 1.

Track listing
UK CD" Single

Charts

References

2007 singles
Jill Scott (singer) songs
2007 songs
Songs written by Jill Scott (singer)
Hidden Beach Recordings singles
Songs written by Adam Blackstone
Funk songs
Gospel songs